Walter John Chilsen (November 11, 1923 – December 25, 2018) was an American politician who was a Republican Member of the Wisconsin Senate, representing the 29th District from 1967 to 1990.

Biography
Chilsen attended Northwestern University, and later graduated with a BS from Lawrence University in 1949. He was a veteran of World War II, serving in the United States Army Air Forces from 1943 to 1945. He was a co-founder and board member of the Marathon County Workshop for the Handicapped.

Chilsen ran in the April 1, 1969 special election for Wisconsin's 7th congressional district to succeed Melvin Laird (R), who had been appointed and confirmed to be Secretary of Defense. Chilsen lost by 48-52% to David Obey (D), who held the seat another 41 years.

He died on December 25, 2018, at the age of 95. His father was Walter B. Chilsen who also served in the Wisconsin Legislature.

References

1923 births
2018 deaths
United States Army personnel of World War II
American television directors
Lawrence University alumni
Military personnel from Wisconsin
Northwestern University alumni
People from Merrill, Wisconsin
United States Army Air Forces soldiers
Republican Party Wisconsin state senators